Orleans Township is one of ten townships in Orange County, Indiana, United States. As of the 2010 census, its population was 3,555 and it contained 1,518 housing units.

Geography

Cities, towns, villages
 Orleans

Cemeteries
The township contains these three cemeteries: Fairview, Irvin and Old.

Major highways
  Indiana State Road 37

Airports and landing strips
 Orleans Airport

Education
 Orleans Community Schools

Orleans Township is served by the Orleans Town & Township Public Library.

Political districts
 Indiana's 9th congressional district
 State House District 62
 State Senate District 44

References
 
 United States Census Bureau 2008 TIGER/Line Shapefiles
 IndianaMap

External links
 Indiana Township Association
 United Township Association of Indiana
 City-Data.com page for Orleans Township

Townships in Orange County, Indiana
Townships in Indiana